Aliaksei Shynkel (born 6 July 1994) is a Belarusian handball player for HC Meshkov Brest and the Belarusian national team.

He participated at the 2017 World Men's Handball Championship.

References

1994 births
Living people
Sportspeople from Grodno
Belarusian male handball players